The 2003 AAPT Championships was a men's tennis tournament played on outdoor hard courts in Adelaide in Australia and was part of the International Series of the 2003 ATP Tour. The tournament ran from 30 December 2002 through 5 January 2003. Unseeded Nikolay Davydenko won the singles title.

Finals

Singles

 Nikolay Davydenko defeated  Kristof Vliegen 6–2, 7–6(7–3)
 It was Davydenko's 1st singles title of his career.

Doubles

 Jeff Coetzee /  Chris Haggard defeated  Max Mirnyi /  Jeff Morrison 2–6, 6–4, 7–6(9–7)
 It was Coetzee's only title of the year and the 3rd of his career. It was Haggard's only title of the year and the 4th of his career.

External links
 ATP Tournament Profile

AAPT Championships
Next Generation Adelaide International
Aap
2000s in Adelaide
December 2002 sports events in Australia
January 2003 sports events in Australia